Namor the Sub-Mariner: Conquered Shores, also simply referred to as Namor: Conquered Shores, is an American comic book based on the Marvel Comics character Namor. The five-issue limited series – written by Christopher Cantwell and illustrated by Pasqual Ferry – began its monthly publication on October 12, 2022, and is expected to conclude in 2023.

Development 
The five-issue limited series Namor: Conquered Shores was written by Christopher Cantwell and illustrated by Pasqual Ferry. It was also lettered by Joe Caramagna and colored by Matt Hollingsworth.

Publication 
Namor: Conquered Shores began its monthly publication with the release of its first issue on October 12, 2022, and is expected to conclude with the launch of its fifth and final issue in 2023.

Issues

Reception 
Reviewing Namor: Conquered Shores, Nicole Drum of ComicBook.com wrote: "Namor: Conquered Shores reads like the start of an incredible story and is easily one of the best Namor stories so far in a long history. By honoring the character's history and roots, Cantwell and Ferry are bringing this beloved character to life in a manner that is accessible and thoughtful all in the furtherance of a story possessing real questions about the human condition, reflection, and compassion." Sergio Pereira of Comic Book Resources described Namor: Conquered Shores as "a much better version" of Kevin Reynolds' film Waterworld (1995), explaining that the post-apocalyptic setting present in the series is better developed than the one seen in the film.

References

External links 
  at Marvel.com
 

2022 comics debuts
2022 in comics
Comic book limited series
Dystopian comics
Fiction set on ocean planets
Post-apocalyptic comics
Superhero comics